Charles Edward Foulkes (7 February 1905 – May 1986) was an English footballer who made 64 appearances in the Football League for Lincoln City. He played as a centre half. He was also on the books of Bradford City and Bournemouth & Boscombe Athletic without representing either in the league.

References

1905 births
1986 deaths
People from Bilston
English footballers
Association football defenders
Fryston Colliery Welfare F.C. players
Bradford City A.F.C. players
AFC Bournemouth players
Lincoln City F.C. players
Boston Town F.C. (1920s) players
English Football League players
Place of death missing
Association football midfielders